Damjan Knežević  (born 8 January 2000) is a Serbian football goalkeeper who plays for Bosnian club Zvijezda 09.

Club career

ČSK Čelarevo
Born in Zemun, Knežević passed throw the youth categories of Partizan, OFK Beograd, Red Star Belgrade and Brodarac. At the beginning of 2017, Knežević moved to Serbian First League side ČSK Čelarevo. After he spent the winter break off-season playing several friendly matches, Knežević signed with the club and became the regular first team member for the second half of the 2016–17 season, being mostly used as a back-up choice. Knežević made his senior debut on 7 April 2017 in the 21 season fixture, replacing Miroslav Tankosić during the match against Dinamo Vranje. Making 6 appearances with the club until the end of a season, Knežević left the club in summer 2017.

International career
Knežević was a part of the first Serbia under-15 national team squad, formed ending of 2014.

Career statistics

References

2000 births
Living people
Footballers from Belgrade
Serbian footballers
Association football goalkeepers
FK ČSK Čelarevo players
FK Mladost Lučani players
FK Železničar Pančevo players
FK Zvijezda 09 players
Serbian First League players
Serbian SuperLiga players
Serbian expatriate footballers
Expatriate footballers in Bosnia and Herzegovina
Serbian expatriate sportspeople in Bosnia and Herzegovina